Crossotelos is an extinct genus of nectridean lepospondyl within the family Urocordylidae. It contains a single species, Crossotelos annulatus.

Crossotelos lived in modern-day Oklahoma and Texas, United States during the Early to Lower Permian.

See also
 Prehistoric amphibian
 List of prehistoric amphibians

References

Holospondyls